Curtis John Guillory, S.V.D. (born September 1, 1943) is an American prelate of the Catholic Church and member of the Society of the Divine Word. Guillory served as Bishop of Beaumont from 2000 to 2020. He was the first non-canonist to hold this position.  

Guillory previously served as an auxiliary bishop for the Diocese of Galveston–Houston from 1988 to 2000, the first (and, as of 2022, the only) Black Catholic bishop in Texas history.

Biography

Early years 
Curtis Guillory was born on September 1, 1943, to Wilfred and Theresa Guillory (née Jardoin) on September 1, 1943, in Bayou Mallet, Louisiana. He is the oldest of 17 children (six sons, eleven daughters); all but five are still living.

Gillory is a descendant of Louisiana free people of color. His father owned a small farm and worked another one. Curtis and his siblings helped in picking cotton, shucking corn, and feeding the animals. During the school year, he would get up early to work on the farm, attend school and return home to work until dark.

Guillory entered the Society of Divine Word St. Augustine Seminary in Bay St. Louis, Mississippi, where he played on the seminary baseball team. In a 2020 interview with the Beaumont Enterprise, Guillory recalled that both his parents were hospitalized at one point and he was going to leave the seminary to come home. His mother told him to do his part by staying there and praying for them.

In 1968, Guillory earned a Bachelor of Arts degree from the Divine Word College at Epworth, Iowa, in 1968. He later earned a Master of Divinity degree at Catholic Theological Union in Chicago, Illinois.

Priesthood 
On December 16, 1972, Guillory was ordained to the priesthood for the Society of Divine Work at his home parish of St. Ann in Mallet by Auxiliary Bishop Carlos Ambrosio Lewis Tullock, auxiliary bishop of Panama.

Guillory first assignment was to St. Augustine Parish in New Orleans. He served three years there as an associate and six years as pastor. Guillory was the founding director of the Tolton House of Studies in New Orleans, the seminary residence for Divine Word students. Guillory also served as a member of the executive committee of the National Association of Black Catholic Administrators, the Louisiana One Church/One Family adoption program, national chaplain to the Knights of Peter Claver, a member of the archdiocesan presbyteral council, and a board member of the Spirituality Center.

In the US Conference of Catholic Bishops (USCCB), Guillory was selected chair of the Committee of African American Catholics. Guillory also served on the national committee on Hispanic Affairs and Priestly Life and Ministry, and the boards of Sacred Heart Seminary and Xavier University in New Orleans. He was a board member of the YMCA, the Mental Health Association, and the Harris County Hospital District in Harris County, Texas.

In 1986, Guillory earned a Master of Christian Spirituality degree from Creighton University in Omaha, Nebraska. He completed a summer workshop in Jungian psychology in Switzerland. In September 1987, Guillory coordinated the visit of Pope John Paul II to New Orleans.

Auxiliary Bishop of Galveston–Houston 
On December 29, 1987, John Paul II appointed Guillory as auxiliary bishop for the Diocese of Galveston–Houston. He was consecrated on February 19, 1988. For his episcopal motto, Guillory chose Romans 8:28: "For those who love God, all things work together for good."

For the 1996 Summer Olympics, Guillory briefly carried the Olympic torch in Texas during its tour around the United States, the only Catholic bishop to receive the honor. On February 4, 2019, Guillory issued a letter of apology in response to a remark by a parish priest that minimalized the criminality of child sexual abuse; "Any act of sexual abuse of a minor is a heinous crime and it is a sin...It’s a grave sin."

Bishop of Beaumont 
On June 2, 2000, John Paul II appointed Guillory bishop of the Diocese of Beaumont. He was installed on July 28, 2000. Guillory was the first African American bishop to lead a Texas diocese and the first Beaumont bishop to belong to a religious congregation. He remained a member of the Society of the Divine Word but while an active bishop was not under its jurisdiction.

While in Beaumont, Guillory established the St. Anthony Cathedral as a basilica, built a Catholic chapel at Lamar University and established a new Catholic Pastoral Center. He also created the Catholic Foundation of the Diocese of Beaumont and started a capital campaign for it. In 2016, Guillory received the Rabbi Samuel Rosinger Humanitarian Award presented by Temple Emanuel in Beaumont, Texas.

Retirement and legacy 
Pope Francis accepted Guillory's resignation on June 9, 2020. and named Father David Toups as his successor.

See also

 Catholic Church hierarchy
 Catholic Church in the United States
 Historical list of the Catholic bishops of the United States
 List of Catholic bishops of the United States
 Lists of patriarchs, archbishops, and bishops

References

External links
Roman Catholic Diocese of Beaumont Official Site
 National Black Catholic Congress bio of Curtis Guillory
 National Black Catholic Clergy Caucus bio of Curtis Guillory

Living people
1943 births
Creighton University alumni
African-American Roman Catholic bishops
Divine Word Missionaries Order
American people of Haitian descent
Louisiana Creole people
21st-century Roman Catholic bishops in the United States
20th-century Roman Catholic bishops in the United States
Knights of Peter Claver & Ladies Auxiliary
21st-century African-American people
20th-century African-American people
St. Augustine Seminary (Bay St. Louis)
African-American Catholic consecrated religious